The first season of the American television series This Is Us follows the lives and families of two parents and their three children born on the same day as their father's birthday. The season is produced by Rhode Island Ave. Productions, Zaftig Films, and 20th Century Fox Television, with Fogelman and Don Todd serving as showrunners.

The season stars an ensemble cast featuring Milo Ventimiglia, Mandy Moore, Sterling K. Brown, Chrissy Metz, Justin Hartley, Susan Kelechi Watson, Chris Sullivan, and Ron Cephas Jones.

The season, which premiered on NBC on September 20, 2016, and ran until March 14, 2017, over 18 episodes, received generally positive reviews from critics. It was chosen by the American Film Institute as one of the top ten television programs of 2016, and received ten nominations for the 69th Primetime Emmy Awards, including Outstanding Drama Series with Brown winning for Outstanding Lead Actor in a Drama Series, as well as receiving nominations for the Golden Globe Award for Best Television Series – Drama and the Critics' Choice Television Award for Best Drama Series. The series was renewed for a second and third season on January 18, 2017.

Cast and characters

Main
 Milo Ventimiglia as Jack Pearson
 Mandy Moore as Rebecca Pearson
 Sterling K. Brown as Randall Pearson
 Chrissy Metz as Kate Pearson
 Justin Hartley as Kevin Pearson
 Susan Kelechi Watson as Beth Pearson
 Chris Sullivan as Toby Damon
 Ron Cephas Jones as William H. "Shakespeare" Hill

Recurring

 Niles Fitch as teenage Randall Pearson
 Lonnie Chavis as young Randall Pearson
 Hannah Zeile as teenage Kate Pearson
 Mackenzie Hancsicsak as young Kate Pearson
 Logan Shroyer as teenage Kevin Pearson
 Parker Bates as young Kevin Pearson
 Eris Baker as Tess Pearson
 Faithe Herman as Annie Pearson
 Jon Huertas as Miguel Rivas
 Gerald McRaney as Dr. Nathan Katowski (aka Dr. K)
 Jermel Nakia as young adult William H. "Shakespeare" Hill
 Janet Montgomery as Olivia Maine
 Milana Vayntrub as Sloane Sandburg
 Ryan Michelle Bathe as Yvette
 Denis O'Hare as Jessie
 Adam Bartley as Duke
 Alexandra Breckenridge as Sophie
 Amanda Leighton as teenage Sophie
 Sophia Coto as young Sophie
 Jill Johnson as Laurie
 Caitlin Thompson as Madison

Guest
 Alan Thicke as himself
 Brad Garrett as Wes Manning
 Katey Sagal as Lanie Schulz
 Jami Gertz as Marin Rosenthal
 Seth Meyers as himself
 Jimmi Simpson as Andy Fannan
 Elizabeth Perkins as Janet Malone
 Peter Onorati as Stanley Pearson
 Mario Lopez as himself
 Wynn Everett as Shelly
 Ron Howard as himself
 Susan Blakely as Anne

Episodes

Production

Development
Dan Fogelman and Don Todd served as the season's showrunners.

Casting
In 2015, Mandy Moore, Milo Ventimiglia, Justin Hartley, Sterling K. Brown, and Ron Cephas Jones were the first to be cast in Dan Fogelman’s pilot. Chrissy Metz was later cast in the pilot, followed by Susan Kelechi Watson. Jon Huertas joined the cast in 2016.

Reception

Critical response
The first season of This Is Us received positive reviews, with critics praising cast performances and series plot. On Rotten Tomatoes, it has an approval rating of 91% based on 65 reviews, with a weighted average of 7.67/10. The site's critical consensus reads, "Featuring full-tilt heartstring-tugging family drama, This Is Us will provide a suitable surrogate for those who have felt a void in their lives since Parenthood went off the air." 

On Metacritic, the season has a normalized score of 76 out of 100, based on 34 critics, indicating "generally favorable reviews". TVLine gave the series "A−" saying, "With emotionally resonant dialogue and top-notch performances, This Is Us should fill that Braverman-sized hole in your heart." TV Guide placed This Is Us at ninth among the top ten picks for the most anticipated new shows of the 2016–2017 season and called it, "a well-acted drama about love, life and family."

Writing for The Star-Ledger, Vicki Hyman lauded the series and said, "This Is Us (from Crazy, Stupid, Love screenwriter Dan Fogelman) methodically weaves four seemingly disparate stories into a believable and emotional whole through tiny telling details, relateable moments, and conversations and confrontations that are funny, tender or painful, or all three at once." Entertainment Weeklys Jeff Jensen wrote, "A 21st century thirtysomething for a TV generation that likes a splash of high concept in their shows and isn't afraid of melodrama." Gwen Ihnat of The A.V. Club also reviewed the series positively saying, "The hour accomplishes what it set out to do. It creates characters so compelling that we compulsively want to tune back in to see them again." 

In a review for The Boston Globe, Matthew Gilbert said, "The pilot is beautifully shaped, the themes of building your own meaning in life are smart, and the actors already seem to know their characters."

The Washington Post critic Hank Stuever said, "While I'd like to see another few episodes to make sure, there's something comfortably gooey right away about This Is Us, reminding us once more that amid all the high-functioning detectives, emergency-rescue personnel and secret-agent superheroes covered in cryptic tattoos, there are very few network dramas aimed at viewers who are simply interested in everyday people and how they feel." Pittsburgh Post-Gazettes TV critic Rob Owen wrote, "Created and written by Dan Fogelman, This is Us manages the tricky task of telling emotional stories without getting too saccharine. And in each story, the characters are quite relatable." James Poniewozik of The New York Times also gave the series positive reviews and said, "The first hour works its way efficiently through an economy-size box of tissues with cleverly turned dialogue and well-inhabited performances." The series also received praise from critics at other publications such as USA Today, The Atlantic, The Hollywood Reporter, and The Los Angeles Times.

Some were more critical towards the show, Daniel D'Addario of Time wrote, "The show has promise, but its cynicism in terms of trying to evoke an emotional response is both what viewers will be tuning in for and its least accomplished aspect. If it could work to wring out a real response, not just an easy one, this might be a show worth watching each week. Ben Travers, Chief TV critic of Indiewire, quipped, "'It all works out' seems to be the main takeaway from the pilot, but where things specifically go from here is one whopping question mark. Perhaps if this was an episodic anthology series with new characters flooding in every week and new arcs every season, This Is Us could repeat the mysterious highs of its subjectively mediocre pilot (depending on how you like that ending)." 

In a moderate review for Variety, Sonia Saraiya said, "It's deceptively difficult to build a surprising and complete story in just 40 minutes with so many characters. Yet This Is Us manages to both craft an intimate series of portraits and stitch them together. But at the same time, waves of cloying sentiment threaten to submerge everything."

Critics' top ten lists
This Is Us was included on multiple Best/Top TV Shows of 2016 lists; these are listed below in order of rank.

Ratings

Accolades

Broadcast
This Is Us premiered on NBC in the United States on September 20, 2016. The series premiered on CTV in Canada on September 21, 2016, on TVNZ 2 in New Zealand on September 27, 2016, and on Channel 4 in the United Kingdom on December 6, 2016. The series premiered on Channel Ten in Australia on February 8, 2017.

References

2016 American television seasons
2017 American television seasons
This Is Us